Jeļena Ostapenko was the defending champion, having won the previous edition in 2019, but lost to Clara Tauson in the final, 3–6, 6–4, 4–6.

Seeds

Draw

Finals

Top half

Bottom half

Qualifying

Seeds

Qualifiers

Draw

First qualifier

Second qualifier

Third qualifier

Fourth qualifier

Fifth qualifier

Sixth qualifier

References

External Links
Main Draw
Qualifying Draw

BGL Luxembourg Open - Singles
2021 Singles